Tomofumi Takajo (born 7 December 1991) is a Japanese judoka.

He is the silver medallist of the 2017 Judo Grand Slam Baku in the -66 kg category.

References

External links
 

1991 births
Living people
Japanese male judoka
20th-century Japanese people
21st-century Japanese people
Judoka at the 2014 Asian Games
Asian Games silver medalists for Japan
Asian Games medalists in judo
Medalists at the 2014 Asian Games